Papua New Guinea competed at the 1996 Summer Olympics in Atlanta, United States.

Results by event

Athletics at the 1996 Summer Olympics|Athletics
Men's 4 × 400 m Relay
 Samuel Bai, Ivan Wakit, Amos Ali, and Subul Babo
 Heat — 3:19.92 (→ did not advance)

Men's 400m Hurdles
Ivan Wakit
 Heat — 53.42s (→did not advance)

Boxing at the 1996 Summer Olympics|Boxing
Men's Featherweight (57 kg)
Lynch Ipera
 First Round — Lost to Daniel Attah (Nigeria) on points (2-14)

Men's Lightweight (60 kg)
Henry Kunsi
 First Round — Lost to Agnaldo Nunez (Brazil) after referee decision (11-11)

Men's Light Welterweight (63,5 kg)
Steven Kevi
 First Round — Lost to Davis Mwale (Zambia) on points (3-16)

References
Official Olympic Reports

Nations at the 1996 Summer Olympics
1996
1996 in Papua New Guinean sport